Chemokine (C-C motif) ligand 8 (CCL8), also known as monocyte chemoattractant protein 2 (MCP2), is a protein that in humans is encoded by the CCL8 gene.

CCL8 is a small cytokine belonging to the CC chemokine family.  The CCL8 protein is produced as a precursor containing 109 amino acids, which is cleaved to produce mature CCL8 containing 75 amino acids.  The gene for CCL8 is encoded by 3 exons and is located within a large cluster of CC chemokines on chromosome 17q11.2 in humans. MCP-2 is chemotactic for and activates many different immune cells, including mast cells, eosinophils and basophils, (that are implicated in allergic responses), and monocytes, T cells, and NK cells that are involved in the inflammatory response.  CCL8 elicits its effects by binding to several different cell surface receptors called chemokine receptors.  These receptors include CCR1, CCR2B, CCR3 and CCR5.

CCL8 is a CC chemokine that utilizes multiple cellular receptors to attract and activate human leukocytes. CCL8 is a potent inhibitor of HIV1 by virtue of its high-affinity binding to the receptor CCR5, one of the major co-receptors for HIV1. In addition, CCL8 attributes to the growth of metastasis in breast cancer cells. The manipulation of this chemokine activity influences the histology of tumors promoting steps of metastatic processes. CCL8 is also involved in attracting macrophages to the decidua in labor.

References

External links

Further reading

Cytokines